A szopelka is a Russian double reed wind instrument, similar in form to the zurna.

References

Russian musical instruments
Russian inventions
Oboes